The Nevada Attorney General is the chief legal officer for the U.S. state of Nevada. The functions of the office are set forth in Nevada Revised Statutes, Chapter 228. The Attorney General represents the people of Nevada in civil and criminal matters before trial, appellate and the supreme courts of Nevada and the United States. The Attorney General also serves as legal counsel to state officers and, with few exceptions, to state agencies, boards and commissions.

The Attorney General may also work with or help district attorneys, local law enforcement, and federal and international criminal justice agencies in the administration of justice. In addition, the Attorney General establishes and operates projects and programs to protect Nevadans from fraud or illegal activities that target consumers or threaten public safety, and enforces laws that safeguard the environment and natural resources.
Under the state Constitution, the Attorney General is elected to a four-year term. To meet its statutory obligations the office is divided into the following:

Bureau of Consumer Protection
Bureau of Criminal Justice
Bureau of Governmental Affairs
Bureau of Public Affairs

The current Nevada Attorney General is Democrat Aaron D. Ford.

Officeholders

See also 
Attorney general

External links 
 Nevada Attorney General official website
 Nevada Attorney General articles at ABA Journal
 News and Commentary at FindLaw
 Nevada Revised Statutes at Law.Justia.com
 U.S. Supreme Court Opinions - "Cases with title containing: State of Nevada" at FindLaw
 State Bar of Nevada
 Nevada Attorney General Adam Paul Laxalt profile at National Association of Attorneys General
 Press releases at Nevada Attorney General

 
State law enforcement agencies of Nevada
Nevada law